Franklin University Switzerland is a private university in Lugano, Switzerland. Founded in 1969, Franklin is one of the oldest American institutions of higher education in Europe and the first to be established in Switzerland. Franklin offers Bachelor of Arts and Master of Science degrees accredited in both the United States and Switzerland.

History 
Formerly Fleming College, the university was founded in 1969. It is named after Benjamin Franklin.

Academics
Franklin's curriculum promotes international awareness and critical thinking and emphasizes an interdisciplinary and liberal arts perspective. The majority of courses are taught in English, with the exception of language courses, including upper-level language courses on film, culture and literature. 

Undergraduate students must achieve proficiency in Italian, French, Spanish, or German through fulfilling a three-year language course sequence. Additionally, it has a core curriculum consisting of Intercultural Competencies (humanities and arts), International Engagement (political science, history and economics) and Social Responsibility (sciences and cultural studies). A full year's worth of study in these three categories is a requirement. Courses in mathematics and writing are required as well. The university offers an internationally focused interdisciplinary curriculum, with 17 majors and 21 minors in its undergraduate program.

Franklin University Switzerland’s graduate programs take advantage of its cross-cultural environment and central location in Europe to provide internationally-focused Master of Science degree programs. 

The average class size at Franklin is 16, with no class exceeding 30 students.

Accreditation 
Franklin University Switzerland is accredited in the United States by the MSCHE. The institution is authorized to offer bachelor's and master's degrees through the State of Delaware. It is also accredited in Switzerland by the Swiss Accreditation Council OAQ as University Institute.

Campus

The main campus (known as Kaletsch Campus), acquired in 1985, is composed of a private villa with attached library, auditorium, and classroom wing, surrounded by a wooded park. Also on this campus is a dining hall called the "Grotto". In 2005 the university acquired an additional campus nearby (known as North Campus), adding administrative, education, athletic, social and residential capacity. The current campus spans . The Franklin campus is residential, and is on a hillside overlooking the town of Lugano, in the Italian-speaking canton of Ticino, Switzerland.

Franklin University Switzerland has nine residence buildings, seven in Sorengo and two in Lugano.
 Airone is in an old hotel directly between the main campus and North Campus with singles and doubles. All rooms have their own bathrooms and some of which have kitchenettes. The ground floor houses the office of Student Life, and one of the student lounges, the "Falcon's Nest".
 Alba is in Lugano 5–10 minutes from North Campus on the way downtown.
 Ciliegi is directly across via Ponte Tresa from Airone. This is the smallest residence on campus, in apartment-style doubles.
 Leonardo da Vinci (LDV) is on the grounds of North Campus; this is the only all-freshman student dormitory.
 Giardino, nestled below the Sorengo monastery: This residence is mainly multiples (4-6 bedrooms and a shared kitchen) with some triples for freshmen.
 Panera is on the main campus grounds next to the Grotto (one of two dining halls) with apartment-style triples. Each apartment consists of four rooms: a bedroom, bathroom (with bathtub), separate kitchen, and a large common room with three desks and a couch. The Panera Lawn is a common meeting place and hang out for many students, no matter what residence they live in.
 The final two buildings are the as-of-late unnamed New Buildings (A and B) located across via Ponte Tresa from Panera. New Building A has four bedroom apartment-style housing, while New Building B has two, three, four, five, and six bedroom apartments, some of which are two stories. All rooms in both New Buildings have arguably the biggest kitchens on campus with at least one bathroom (with a shower) per two students. New Building B offers a noise-free, substance-free rooming option with an emphasis on healthy living for students.

Academic Travel Program
The Academic Travel Program is an integrated part of the Franklin University Switzerland curriculum and is included in tuition, with supplemental fees required for a few destinations. Academic Travel is a credit-bearing degree requirement in which students study topics relevant to a particular place or places and then go with their class to study on location for two weeks. Travel is led by faculty members and relates to the academic expertise of the individual professor and to his or her knowledge of a given country or area.

All students, including semester and year-abroad students, are required to participate in the Academic Travel Program. Academic Travel is a graduation requirement and an integral component of each semester of study. The graduation requirement for Academic Travel is fulfilled by completing four travel courses. Students usually fulfill the requirement by participating each semester of their first two years at Franklin. Students who enter with 30 transfer credits must take a minimum of two consecutive Academic Travel courses.

The travels are themed around academic studies relating to the location visited and the professor guiding the travel. Economics, art history, literature, business and marketing, international relations, environment, sustainability and history are among common themes investigated through travels.

Academic Travel destinations have included the Baltic states, Botswana, Belgium, Brazil, Croatia, Cyprus, Denmark, Dominican Republic, England, France, Germany, Greece, Guatemala, the Netherlands, Iceland, India, Republic of Ireland and Northern Ireland, Italy, Malawi, Morocco, Mozambique, Poland, Romania, Scotland, Serbia, South Korea, Spain, Switzerland, Turkey, and the United States.

Student life at Franklin consists of an emphasis on independent travel in Switzerland and greater Europe, and of student associations, residential life, and interaction with Swiss-Italian culture in Lugano as well an array of diversity amongst individual Franklin students.

Athletics
Franklin University Switzerland offers students a wide variety of sports and fitness programs, as well as activities to promote a healthy lifestyle. Some on-campus sports facilities include the Tone Athletic Center, two volleyball courts, a basketball court and a soccer field.  Organized athletic activities include Men's and Women's Soccer, Men's and Women's Basketball, and Lugano Street Dance. Students are also encouraged to start athletic programs. Student-led activities have included Field Hockey, Yoga, Cross-fit, and Self-Defense.

Since 2000-2001 (with an exception of a bye year in 2001-2002)  Franklin's men's soccer team has competed in the National Swiss Division (5th League). The team competes with other clubs in the league from the Canton of Ticino. Franklin University Switzerland is currently the reserve team for the local club FC Paradiso, making it Franklin FC Paradiso II. In spring 2012 the team won its fourth Fair Play award. The team trains twice a week and competes on the weekends in the fall and spring semesters — home games are played on Friday nights. The players have a mid-season break from December to February.  During this period the school hosts an indoor soccer tournament open to all Franklin students, faculty and staff.

References

External links
 Official website

Liberal arts colleges
Lugano
Schools in the canton of Ticino
Educational institutions established in 1969
1969 establishments in Switzerland